Siemens Mobility is a division of Siemens. With its global headquarters in Munich, Siemens Mobility has four core business units: Mobility Management, dedicated to rail technology and intelligent traffic systems, Railway Electrification, Rolling Stock, and Customer Services.

History
Innovations from the late 19th century, such as the world's first electric train, when Siemens & Halske unveiled a train in which power was supplied through the rails, and the world's first electric tram, with the implementation of 2.5-kilometer-long electric tramway located in Berlin, built at the company's own expense, cemented the use of electric power in transportation systems.

In the following years, inventions such as the first electric trolleybus, mine locomotives, and the first underground railway in continental Europe (in Budapest), set the path from trams and subways to today's high-speed trains.

Siemens, alongside ThyssenKrupp and Transrapid International, was part of the German consortium that built the Shanghai Maglev, inaugurated in 2002 by the German chancellor, Gerhard Schröder, and the Chinese premier, Zhu Rongji. It was the world's first commercial high-speed magnetic levitation train, which holds the title of the fastest commercial service, travelling up to 430 km/h.

In November 2012, Siemens acquired Invensys Rail for £1.7 billion.

In July 2017, Siemens confirmed it had taken over Hannover-based software company HaCon, to be managed as a separate legal entity. The financial details were not disclosed.

In September 2017, Siemens announced a proposal to merge its transportation division with Alstom, with the objective of creating "a new European champion in the rail industry". The combined rail business, to be named Siemens Alstom and headquartered in Paris, would have had $18 billion U.S. in revenue and employed 62,300 people in more than 60 countries. It was seen as a measure to counter the rise of China's CRRC with support from both the French and German governments. However, in February 2019, the European Commission refused permission for the merger to proceed.

During Innotrans in September 2018, Siemens Mobility unveiled the world's first driverless tram in Berlin, the result of a joint research and development project with ViP Verkehrsbetriebe Potsdam, on a six-kilometre section of the tram network in Potsdam, Germany. At the same time, the Data Capture Unit (DCU) was introduced. It is the world's first EBA-certified unidirectional gateway safety assessment, that enables 100% secure connectivity of new and existing safety critical systems, up to Safety integrity level (SIL) 4, to provide data analytics and other cloud hosted digital services.

Key Locations

Products
Locomotives

 Vectron
 Asiarunner
 Eurorunner
 EuroSprinter
 E40 AG-V1 (E40AC)
 Korail Class 8200
 NSB Di6
 NSB Di8
 Amtrak Cities Sprinter (ACS-64)
 Charger
 SNCB Class 77
 VSFT G 322

EMU and DMU

 ICx
 ÖBB Class 4011
 ÖBB Class 4020
 Velaro EMU
 Eurostar e320
 TCDD HT80000
 CRH3
 Mireo EMU
 Desiro EMU/DMU
 Desiro Double Deck
 SBB-CFF-FFS RABe 514
 British Rail Class 185
 British Rail Class 350
 British Rail Class 360
 British Rail Class 444
 British Rail Class 450
 British Rail Class 700
 British Rail Class 707
 British Rail Class 717
 British Rail Class 332 - bodywork built by CAF
 British Rail Class 333 - bodywork built by CAF
 Nexas

Passenger coaches

 Venture
 Viaggio Classic
 Viaggio Comfort
 Viaggio Light
 Viaggio Twin - double deck coach

Light Rail/Trams

First generation: U2
Second generation: SD-100/SD-160, SD-400/SD-460, SD660 
Third generation: S200, S700/S70 
 Avenio
 Combino
 Ultra Low Floor tram

People Mover
 VAL series - acquired from Matra
 VAL 208 - used by CDGVAL, Rennes Metro, U Line, Turin Metro
 VAL 206 - used by Orlyval, Toulouse Metro
 AIRVAL - used by Suvarnabhumi Airport

Metro/Subway

 Singapore MRT C651
 Modular Metro
 Inspiro
 Tren Urbano - customized train set
 Blue Line (MBTA) - customized train set
 New Tube for London
 Taipei Metro C321
 Taipei Metro C341

Maglev 

 Transrapid (Shanghai)
Digital Services
 Data Capture Unit (DCU) - Secure connectivity
 Railigent (CS) - Data Analytics
 Rail Mall (CS) - Spare parts eCommerce
 Intermodal solutions (IMS) - Passenger Apps (planning & eTickets)

See also

Competitors:
 Alstom 
 CAF
 CRRC
 Electro-Motive Diesel
 GE Transportation
 Hitachi Rail
 Hyundai Rotem
 Kinki Sharyo
 Stadler Rail
 Talgo

References 

 Hardware enforced Cybersecurity 
 Monitoring safety-critical railway networks using unidirectional gateways - Data Capture unit
 The application of Smart Data Services in interlocking systems - Data Capture Unit
 Innovative freight solutions on automated rail operations - Siemens Mobility Freight & Products

External links 
 

Siemens
Companies based in Berlin
 
Rolling stock manufacturers of Germany
Rail infrastructure manufacturers
Railway signalling manufacturers